The Coal Industry Nationalisation Act of 1946 (9 & 10 Geo. 6 c. 59) was an Act of the Parliament of the United Kingdom which nationalised, or brought into state control, the coal industry in the United Kingdom. It established the National Coal Board as the managing authority for coal mining and coal processing activities. It also initially provided for the establishment of consumers' councils. The Coal Industry Nationalisation Act 1946 was the first of a number of Acts promulgated by the post-war Labour government to nationalise elements of the UK's industrial infrastructure; other Acts include the Electricity Act 1947; the Transport Act 1947 (railways and long-distance road haulage); the Gas Act 1948; and the Iron and Steel Act 1949.

Background 
The Coal Industry Nationalisation Bill was published in December 1945 by the Minister of Fuel and Power, Emanuel Shinwell, and got passed through the House of Commons by his Parliamentary Secretary Hugh Gaitskell. Several commentators have noted that the Bill was imperfect and had been ‘hastily cobbled together’, just four months after the King's Speech. However, this approach was expedient for the government as the coal mining industry was in a poor state following the war and the Labour government wished to show that their manifesto commitments were being implemented.    

The coal industry nationalisation was different to later enactments. The owners of coal mines and facilities were compensated with government stock; this demonstrated to the miners, who were powerful political force, that the industry belonged to the nation. For later nationalisations compensation was by stock issued by the relevant Board. This simplified the system as compensation was based in the market value of shares in the relevant undertaking.

Coal Industry Nationalisation Act 1946 
The Coal Industry Nationalisation Act 1946 received royal assent on 12 July 1946. Its long title is ‘An Act to establish public ownership and control of the coal-mining industry and certain allied activities; and for purposes connected therewith.’

Provisions 
The provisions of the act comprise 65 sections in nine parts, plus four schedules.

  The National Coal Board
 Sections 1–4: Establishment of National Coal Board, its functions, constitution, power of the Minister, and establishment of Consumers' councils,
 Transfer of assets to the Board
 Sections 5–9: Transfer of assets; interests in patents and designs; rights and liabilities; use of certain property; determination of questions of transfer,
 Compensation for transfer of assets
 Sections 10–16: Compensation for transfer and basis for assessment; allocation of transferred interests; Central and District Valuation Boards; compensation; payment of costs; time limits,
 Compensation for severance, and refunds of capital outlay
 Sections 17 & 18: Compensation for severance; refund of capital outlay
 Satisfaction and disposal of compensation
 Sections 19–25: Date of compensation; recipients of compensation; mode of satisfaction; interim income; satisfaction of compensation; restrictions on disposal of stock; protection; debenture and shareholders of companies,
 Financial provisions
 Sections 26–35: Advances by the minister; borrowing powers; payments to the minister; reserve fund; surplus revenues; accounts and audits; issue of stock; general provisions of stock; Consolidated Fund; payments and advances to the Board; account of receipts,
 Savings, and provisions consequential on nationalisation
 Sections 36–45: Provision of superannuation rights; transfer of property; functions of the Coal Commission; abolition of coal advisory committee;  Miners' Welfare Commission; safety and health research; winding-up of coal-selling schemes; Doncaster Drainage District,
 Miscellaneous provisions as to the Board
 Sections 46–54: Terms and conditions of employment; taxation; transfer of liability for subsidence; liability of the board; workmen's compensation liabilities; documents of the board; plans of workings; transferred documents; annual report,
 General
 Sections 55–65: Payment of certain expenses; disclosure of information; penalties; prosecutions and offences; notices; arbitration; regulations; interpretation application to Scotland; short title, extent and repeal.
 First schedule
 Assets to be transferred to the board
 Second schedule
 Transfer to the board of rights and liabilities under contracts
 Third schedule
 Provisions as to Selling Schemes under part I of the Coal Mines Act 1930, and as to the South Yorkshire Mines Drainage Committee
 Fourth schedule
 Enactments repealed

Later enactments 
The following Acts amended elements of the 1946 Act.

The Coal Industry Act 1949 (13 and 14 Geo. 6  c. 53) amended and repealed parts of the 1946 Act including the composition of the National Coal Board; extended the area of relevant activities; and terminated contracts.

The Miners’ Welfare Act 1952 (15 and 16 Geo. 6 and 1 Eliz. 2 c. 23) dissolved the Miners’ Welfare Commission.

The Coal Industry Act 1956 (c. 61).

The Coal Industry Act 1965 (1965 c. 82) made provision for borrowing by, and loans by the Minister of Power to, the National Coal Board.

The Mines (Working Facilities and Support) Act 1966 (c. 4) consolidated Part I of the Mines (Working Facilities and Support) Act 1923.

The Coal Industry Act 1971 (1971 c. 16) extended the powers of the National Coal Board.

The Coal Industry Act 1977 (1977 c. 39) amended the financial powers of the National Coal Board.

The Coal Industry Act 1987 (1987 c. 3) changed the name of the National Coal Board to the British Coal Corporation.

The Coal Industry Act 1990 (1990 c. 3) made new provision for grants by the Secretary of State to the British Coal Corporation.

The Coal Industry Act 1994 (1994 c. 21) established the functions of a new body the Coal Authority; restructured the coal industry, transferred the property, rights and liabilities of the British Coal Corporation and its wholly owned subsidiaries; and made provision for the dissolution of the corporation; abolished the Domestic Coal Consumers’ Council.

See also 

 Nationalisation
 History of coal mining § Great Britain
 Coal mining in the United Kingdom

References 

United Kingdom Acts of Parliament 1946
Coal mining in the United Kingdom
Nationalisation in the United Kingdom
Austerity in the United Kingdom (1939–1954)
Coal industry